The Central Bank and Trust Corp. was a bank founded in 1906 by Coca-Cola co-founder Asa Griggs Candler. It had its headquarters in the Candler Building in Downtown Atlanta.
In 1922 it was merged into Citizens & Southern National Bank, the present successor entity to which is the Bank of America.

References

Banks based in Georgia (U.S. state)
Banks established in 1906
Defunct banks of the United States
Banks disestablished in 1922
1906 establishments in Georgia (U.S. state)